The Archdiocese of N'Djaména is the Metropolitan See for the Ecclesiastical province of N’Djaména in Chad.

History

 January 9, 1947: Established as Apostolic Prefecture of Fort-Lamy from:
Apostolic Prefecture of Berbérati, Central African Republic
Apostolic Vicariate of Foumban, Cameroon
Apostolic Vicariate of Khartoum, Sudan 
September 14, 1955: Promoted as Diocese of Fort-Lamy 
December 22, 1961: Promoted as Metropolitan Archdiocese of Fort-Lamy 
October 15, 1973: Renamed as Metropolitan Archdiocese of N’Djaména

Special churches

The seat is the Cathédrale de Notre-Dame in N’Djaména.

Leadership, in reverse chronological order
Metropolitan Archbishops of N’Djaména (Roman rite), below
Archbishop Edmond Jitangar: August 20, 2016 - present
Archbishop Matthias N’Gartéri Mayadi: July 31, 2003  – November 19, 2013
Archbishop Charles Louis Joseph Vandame, S.J.: May 23, 1981 – July 31, 2003
Archbishop Paul-Pierre-Yves Dalmais, S.J.: October 15, 1973 – March 6, 1980; see below
Metropolitan Archbishop of Fort-Lamy (Roman rite), below
Archbishop Paul-Pierre-Yves Dalmais, S.J.: December 22, 1961 – October 15, 1973; see above & below
Bishop of Fort-Lamy (Roman rite), below 
Bishop Paul-Pierre-Yves Dalmais, S.J.: December 24, 1957 – December 22, 1961; see above
Prefect Apostolic of Fort-Lamy, below
Father Joseph du Bouchet, S.J.: April 25, 1947 - 1957

Suffragan dioceses
Diocese of Doba
Diocese of Goré
Diocese of Lai
Diocese of Moundou
Diocese of Pala
Diocese of Sarh

See also
List of Roman Catholic dioceses in Chad
Aïda Yazbeck, Catholic nun, Al-Mouna Cultural Center Director

References

Sources
GCatholic.org

N'Djamena
Christian organizations established in 1947
1947 establishments in Chad
N'Djamena
A
Roman Catholic archbishops of N'Djaména